Herbert III d'Omois, Herbert the old, Heribert le Vieux (910 – 980/985) was count of Omois from 943 to his death.

He was the son of Herbert II, Count of Vermandois and Adela of France, daughter of King Robert I of France. In 943 after his father died, he succeeded as count of Omois "and received the fortress of Château-Thierry as well as the abbey of Saint-Médard, Soissons."

In 951, in his late years, he was married to Eadgifu of Wessex, daughter of Edward the Elder, King of England, and widow of Charles the Simple, King of West Francia. After his death, King Lothair divided his estates between his nephews, Eudes I, Count of Blois and Herbert III, Count of Meaux.

Because he is sometimes referred to as "Herbert III of Vermandois, Count of Omois" he is often confused with his nephew Herbert III of Vermandois, Count of Vermandois who lived 953 to 1015, and was the son Adalbert I, Count of Vermandois.

References

Sources

External links
 Comtes de Vermandois
 Généalogie d'Herbert le Vieux sur le site Medieval Lands 
 Généalogie d'Herbert II de Vermandois, son père, sur le site Foundation for Medieval Genealogy 

Herbertien dynasty
Counts of Omois
Counts of Meaux
10th-century French people
910 births
980s deaths
Year of death uncertain